Benjamin Russell Mackintosh Stoneham, Baron Stoneham of Droxford (born 26 August 1948) is a British peer, journalist, and Liberal Democrat politician. He is currently the Liberal Democrat Chief Whip in the House of Lords, having been elected to that position in October 2016.

Education

He was educated at Harrow School, Christ's College, Cambridge (BA, 1970), the University of Warwick (MA, 1971) and London Business School.

Political career 
Stoneham's early politics were Labour. At the age of 29 he was Labour candidate in the Saffron Walden by-election of 1977. He was later treasurer of the moderate Campaign for Labour Victory, many of whose leading lights later joined the SDP. Stoneham was the SDP candidate for Parliament in Stevenage in 1983 and 1987. In 1983, he had the best finish by any non-incumbent SDP candidate in an English seat and narrowly lost by about 1,700 votes.

In 2004, he stood for election in Denmead, Winchester, and in 2010 he stood for election in Bishops Waltham, Winchester.

He is a senior party activist for the Liberal Democrat party.
From 2003 to 2010, he was operations director of the party, under the leadership of Charles Kennedy, and Nick Clegg.
He was made a Life peer on 17 January 2011 as Baron Stoneham of Droxford, of Meon Valley in the County of Hampshire.
He gave his maiden speech on 20 January 2011.

In October 2016, Lord Stoneham was elected as the Liberal Democrat Chief Whip in the House of Lords, succeeding Lord Newby.

Super-injunction statement
Lord Stoneham came to prominence on 19 May 2011 when used parliamentary privilege to reveal details of a super-injunction during a debate in the House of Lords. He questioned whether a super-injunction prevented bank regulators from investigating corporate governance at the Royal Bank of Scotland:

Reprimanded
Lord Stoneham was reprimanded on 27 February 2013 by his own party following reports he telephoned and angrily remonstrated with one of the women who had complained to newspapers about his close friend Lord Rennard's alleged sexual harassment of party workers. Nick Clegg's aides described Lord Stoneham's conduct as "completely unacceptable." Liberal Democrat chief whip in the House of Lords, Lord Newby gave a warning to Lord Stoneham over his conduct.

Personal life
He is married to Anne Kristine Mackintosh. Lady Stoneham is appointed as Chair of The Board of Trustees of the charity St Christopher’s Fellowship and a member of the Avon Tyrrell Trust. In 2012 she was awarded an MBE, for services to young people.

External links
"Lord exposes Sir Fred Goodwin super-injunction in Parliament", The Telegraph, 19 May 2011

References

1948 births
Alumni of Christ's College, Cambridge
Alumni of the University of Warwick
Labour Party (UK) parliamentary candidates
Liberal Democrats (UK) life peers
Living people
People educated at Harrow School
Place of birth missing (living people)
Social Democratic Party (UK) parliamentary candidates
Life peers created by Elizabeth II